Alta Mesa Memorial Park is a non-denominational burial ground located in Palo Alto, Santa Clara County, California. It was established in 1904 as a 72-acre cemetery. It includes traditional burial plots, a mausoleum and a columbarium.

Notable burials
 Arthur Bridgman Clark (1866–1948), architect, professor, first Mayor of Mayfield
 Bertha Wright (1876–1971), founder of the Children's Hospital Oakland
 Birge Clark (1893–1989), architect
 Charles Gilman Norris (1881–1945), novelist
 David Packard (1912–1996), co-founder of Hewlett-Packard and U.S. Deputy Secretary of Defense
 Frank Bacon (1864–1922), actor and playwright
 Frederick Terman (1900–1982), considered (along with Shockley) the father of Silicon Valley
 Herold Ruel (1896–1963), major-league American baseball player
 Kathleen Thompson Norris (1880–1966), American novelist
 Ray Lyman Wilbur (1875–1949), physician, third president of Stanford University and 31st U.S. Secretary of the Interior
 Ron "Pigpen" McKernan (1945–1973), keyboardist, harmonica player and lead vocalist, founding member of the Grateful Dead
 Shirley Temple (1928–2014), American film and television actress, singer, dancer, and public servant
 Sidney Dean Townley (1867–1946), Professor of Astronomy, Stanford University
 Stephen Timoshenko (1878–1972), Professor of Applied Mechanics, Stanford University and namesake of the Timoshenko Medal
 Steve Jobs (1955–2011), co-founder of Apple Inc. (unmarked grave)
 Tennessee Ernie Ford (1919–1991), musician
 Thomas A. Bailey (1902–1983), American historian
 Wilhelmina Harper (1884–1973), successful children's author in the 1930s and 1940s, and published more than 40 compilations of children and young adult stories
 William Shockley (1910–1989), developed transistor and won Nobel Prize for Physics
 Y.A. Tittle (1926–2017), football player

References

External links
 
 

1904 establishments in California
Buildings and structures in Palo Alto, California
Cemeteries in Santa Clara County, California